Tony Blair (born 1953) was Prime Minister of the United Kingdom from 1997 to 2007. 

Tony Blair may also refer to:
Tony Blair Faith Foundation, an organisation founded by Tony Blair aimed at countering religious extremism
The Trial of Tony Blair, a 2007 television film
The Hunt for Tony Blair, a 2011 episode of The Comic Strip Presents...
The Prisoner or: How I Planned to Kill Tony Blair, a 2007 documentary by American filmmaker Michael Tucker
Tony Blair, the principal character from the 1980 BBC television series Buccaneer played by Bryan Marshall
"Tony Blair" (song), by Chumbawamba

See also
Anthony Blair (disambiguation)
Tonibler, a male given name in Kosovo